The 2019 Hebei China Fortune F.C. season will be Hebei China Fortune's 4th consecutive season in the Chinese Super League ever since it started back in the 2004 season and 4th consecutive season in the top flight of Chinese football. This season Hebei China Fortune participates in the Chinese Super League and Chinese FA Cup.

Transfers and loans

Squad statistics

Appearances and goals

|-
! colspan=14 style=background:#dcdcdc; text-align:center| Players transferred out during the season

Disciplinary Record

Friendlies

Pre-season

Competitions

Chinese Super League

Table

Results summary

Results by round

Matches
All times are local (UTC+8).

Source:

Chinese FA Cup

References

Hebei F.C. seasons
Hebei